This is the second time the European Shield took place. Germany and the Czech Republic had little experience having only played a few games beforehand. Serbia were a little more experienced taking players from their domestic league, the Serbian Championship. The shield was hailed as a success in promoting rugby league in the three countries, attendances were good and the players gathered more experience.

Results

Standings

See also

References

External links

European Shield